The fourth competition weekend of the 2018–19 ISU Speed Skating World Cup was held at Thialf in Heerenveen, Netherlands, from Friday, 14 December until Sunday, 16 December 2018.

Schedule
The detailed event schedule:

Medal summary

Men's events

 In mass start, race points are accumulated during the race based on results of the intermediate sprints and the final sprint. The skater with most race points is the winner.

Women's events

 In mass start, race points are accumulated during the race based on results of the intermediate sprints and the final sprint. The skater with most race points is the winner.

Standings
Standings after completion of the event.

Men

500 m

1000 m

1500 m

5000 and 10.000 m

Mass start

Team pursuit

Team sprint

Women

500 m

1000 m

1500 m

3000 and 5000 m

Mass start

Team pursuit

Team sprint

References

4
ISU World Cup, 2018-19, 4
ISU Speed Skating World Cup, 2018-19, World Cup 4
2018 in Dutch sport
ISU Speed Skating World Cup